The English Encyclopaedia was an encyclopedia printed in London for George Kearsley in 1802.

It was 10 volumes; Vol. I 820pp., Vol. II 871pp., Vol. III 810pp., Vol. IV 805pp., Vol. V 812pp., Vol. VI 801pp., Vol. VII 796pp., Vol.VIII 784pp., Vol. IX 804pp., Vol.X 1150pp. plus 16pp., description of plates & 2pp. book ads by Kearsley & also incl. supplement which commences at page 183.

Title page says "A collection of treatises and a dictionary of terms covering the arts & sciences, illustrated with upwards of 400 copperplates. Compiled from modern authors of the first eminence in the different branches of science."

This encyclopedia would form the basis of Kearsley's later work Pantologia which he began compiling in 1802.

See also
Encyclopedists
Reference work
List of historical encyclopedias

Notes

External links 
From Google Books and Internet Archive
Vol I: A to Book
Vol II: Book-keeping to Diameter
Vol III: Diamond to Glass-wort
Vol IV: Glastonbury to Kilkenny
Vol V: Killala to Medicine
Vol VI: Medicine: Chronic Diseases to Nimpo
Vol VII: Nimrod to Philoxenus
Vol VIII: Philter to Relievo
Vol IX: Religion to Traumatic Balsam
Vol X: Treacle to Zytomierz

British encyclopedias
English-language encyclopedias
19th-century encyclopedias